Ulysees Gilbert III (born August 9, 1997) is an American football linebacker for the Tampa Bay Buccaneers of the National Football League (NFL). He played college football at Akron and was drafted by the Pittsburgh Steelers in the sixth round of the 2019 NFL Draft.

Professional career

Pittsburgh Steelers
Gilbert was drafted by the Pittsburgh Steelers in the sixth round (207th overall) of the 2019 NFL Draft. The Steelers originally acquired the selection in an offseason trade that sent Marcus Gilbert to the Arizona Cardinals. On November 5, 2019, the Steelers placed Gilbert on injured reserve with a back injury.

On November 4, 2020, Gilbert was placed on injured reserve with another back injury. He was activated on December 12, 2020. He was again placed on injured reserve on December 25, 2020. He was waived/injured on August 10, 2022, and was placed on injured reserve the next day. He was waived with an injury settlement on August 19, 2022.

Tampa Bay Buccaneers
On October 11, 2022, Gilbert was signed to the Tampa Bay Buccaneers practice squad. He was promoted to the active roster on January 10, 2023.

References

External links
Akron Zips bio

1997 births
Living people
Akron Zips football players
American football linebackers
Pittsburgh Steelers players
Players of American football from Florida
Sportspeople from Ocala, Florida
Tampa Bay Buccaneers players